GUAFC can refer to:

 Garswood United A.F.C.
 Griffith University Australian Football Club

See also
GUFC (disambiguation)